The Bastora Dam or Goma-Span Dam is a gravity dam currently being constructed on the Bastora River at Goma span gorge, near Gomespan, in Erbil Governorate, Iraq.

The primary purpose of the dam is water supply for irrigation but it will support a small 2.4 MW hydroelectric power station. It is expected to irrigate .

References

External links

Dams in Iraq
Dams in the Tigris River basin
Roller-compacted concrete dams
Gravity dams
Dams under construction
Hydroelectric power stations in Iraq
Erbil Governorate